Jorge Luis Molina Cabrera (born 5 March 1987) is a Peruvian footballer who plays for Peruvian Segunda División club Cienciano as a midfielder.

Club career
Playing for Arequipa-based club Total Clean, Molina made his Torneo Descentralizado debut on November 11, 2007 at home against Deportivo Municipal in the 2007 season. Manager Hélard Delgado put him in the starting eleven and later replaced Molina for Joel Sánchez in the 65th minute of the match, which finished in a 4–1 win for his club.

Honours

Club
Juan Aurich
 Peruvian First Division: 2011

References

External links

1988 births
Living people
People from Pisco, Peru
Peruvian footballers
Club Alianza Lima footballers
Total Chalaco footballers
Juan Aurich footballers
León de Huánuco footballers
Peruvian Primera División players
Association football midfielders